Oppermann's conjecture is an unsolved problem in mathematics on the distribution of prime numbers. It is closely related to but stronger than Legendre's conjecture, Andrica's conjecture, and Brocard's conjecture. It is named after Danish mathematician Ludvig Oppermann, who announced it in an unpublished lecture in March 1877.

Statement
The conjecture states that, for every integer x > 1, there is at least one prime number between 
 x(x − 1) and x2,
and at least another prime between 
 x2 and x(x + 1).
It can also be phrased equivalently as stating that the prime-counting function must take unequal values at the endpoints of each range. That is:
 π(x2 − x) < π(x2) < π(x2 + x) for x > 1
with π(x) being the number of prime numbers less than or equal to x.
The end points of these two ranges are a square between two pronic numbers, with each of the pronic numbers being twice a pair triangular number. The sum of the pair of triangular numbers is the square.

Consequences
If the conjecture is true, then the gap size would be on the order of

.

This also means there would be at least two primes between x2 and (x + 1)2 (one in the range from x2 to x(x + 1) and the second in the range from x(x + 1) to (x + 1)2), strengthening Legendre's conjecture that there is at least one prime in this range. Because there is at least one non-prime between any two odd primes it would also imply Brocard's conjecture that there are at least four primes between the squares of consecutive odd primes. Additionally, it would imply that the largest possible gaps between two consecutive prime numbers could be at most proportional to twice the square root of the numbers, as Andrica's conjecture states.

The conjecture also implies that at least one prime can be found in every quarter revolution of the Ulam spiral.

Status
Even for small values of x, the numbers of primes in the ranges given by the conjecture are much larger than 1, providing strong evidence that the conjecture is true. However, Oppermann's conjecture has not been proved

See also 

 Bertrand's postulate
 Firoozbakht's conjecture
 Prime number theorem

References

Conjectures about prime numbers
Unsolved problems in number theory